The Cayman Islands national football team is the national team of the Cayman Islands, and is controlled by the Cayman Islands Football Association. It is a member of FIFA and CONCACAF. Cayman Islands' home ground is Truman Bodden Stadium in George Town, and their head coach is Benjamin Pugh. 
Prior to Pugh's appointment, the Cayman Island's national team had failed to win a single game in over 9 years, sinking to 206 in the FIFA World Rankings. They have recently advanced 13 places in the rankings; winning 4 out of 6 Nation's League Qualifiers (including a win against Barbados).

History

1985–2000

The Caymanian football team played its first international match on 3 March 1985, against Dominica, in Roseau, as part of the 1985 CFU Championship. They lost that match 2–1 with Lee Ramoon - who would go on to become the team's top scorer - opening the scoring.

They qualified for the 1991 Caribbean Cup, falling in the first round. They returned to the tournament in 1994, suffering the same fate. However, the following year, the Cayman Islands jointly organized with Jamaica the 1995 Caribbean Cup, reaching the semi-finals. It fell to Trinidad and Tobago by a scandalous 2–9, the worst defeat in its history. In the match for 3rd place, they were defeated by Cuba 0–3. They would qualify again in 1998 although they failed to get past the group stage. They have not played a Caribbean Cup final phase since then.

The Cayman Islands participated in their first World Cup qualifying tie in the 1998 where they succumbed in the first round at the hands of Cuba, who eliminated them after winning twice 0–1 and 0–5.

2000–2010

In 2000, given the status of the Cayman Islands as one of the British overseas territories, the national team attempted to use this as a loophole to call up a number of uncapped players possessing British passports but who had no specific links to the islands. Barry McIntosh, a football agent, was called in to scout players for an upcoming FIFA World Cup qualifier against Cuba and ultimately he secured eight players i.e. Wayne Allison (Tranmere Rovers), Ged Brannan (Motherwell), David Barnett (Lincoln City), Martin O'Connor (Birmingham City), Dwayne Plummer (Bristol City), Barry Hayles (Fulham), Neville Roach (Southend United) and Neil Sharpe (Boreham Wood). With the exception of Allison the players all appeared in a 5–0 friendly defeat against D.C. United but before they could appear in any official internationals FIFA stepped in and barred the players from representing the Cayman Islands due to their failure to satisfy the existing rules for national team eligibility. Of the eight players only Hayles went on to play international football, appearing for Jamaica ten times.

In the first round of the 2002 qualifiers, Cayman Islands was once again eliminated by Cuba, winning 4–0 in Havana and drawing 0–0 in George Town. History repeated itself four years later, in the 2006 qualifiers, since the Cubans eliminated the Caymanian team from the World Cup for the third time in a row (1–2 in George Town and 4–0 in Havana).

Things didn't change significantly for the 2010 qualifiers, only this time it was Bermuda that eliminated the Cayman Islands in the first round, 4–2 on aggregate. Regardless, this tie saw the Caymanians earn their first points away from home, earning a 1–1 draw at Hamilton on 3 February 2008, with Allean Grant scoring in the 87th minute.

2010–present 

Qualifying directly into the second round of the 2014 qualifiers, the Cayman Islands were drawn in group A along with their peers from El Salvador, the Dominican Republic and Suriname. They lost 5 games out of 6, rescuing a 1-1 draw on the last day, on 14 November 2011, against the Dominicans. The Caymanian team did not play any match again in the next few years, since declining their participation in the 2012 and 2014 Caribbean Cups. But they returned to the 2018 qualifiers, facing Belize in the first round. The first leg in Belmopan finished 0–0 and the second leg in George Town finished 1–1. The 1–1 aggregate score meant the Cayman Islands were eliminated on the away goal rule. With this unbeaten elimination, Cayman Islands can say that they are one of the few teams in the world that did not qualify for a FIFA World Cup despite not losing a single match.

Recent results and forthcoming fixtures

The following is a list of match results in the last 12 months, as well as any future matches that have been scheduled.

2022

2023

Coaching history

 Neider dos Santos (1993–1996)
 Ken Fogarty (1996–1999)
 Márcio Máximo (2000–2001)
 Marcos Tinoco (2001–2005)
 Carl Brown (2006–2011)
 David Braham (2011–2015)
 Chandler González (2015–2018)
 Charles McLean (2018)
 Chandler González (2018–2019)
 Benjamin Pugh (2019–present)

Players

Current squad
 The following players were called up for the 2022–23 CONCACAF Nations League matches.
 Match dates: 3, 6 and 9 June 2022
 Opposition:  (twice) and 
 Caps and goals correct as of: '9 June 2022, after the match against 

Recent call-ups

  = Withdrew due to injury
  = Preliminary squad
  = Training player
   = Withdrew (non-injury)
  = Retired

Player recordsPlayers in bold are still active with Cayman Islands.Most appearances

Top goalscorers

Competitive record
FIFA World Cup

CONCACAF Gold Cup

CONCACAF Nations League

Caribbean Cup

Head-to-head recordAs of 9 June 2022 after match against ''

References

External links
Cayman Islands FIFA.com
Cayman Islands Football Association 

 
Caribbean national association football teams